Broadstone was a railway station in the northern part of the Borough of Poole in the county of Dorset in England. It opened in 1872 under the name of New Poole Junction and closed to passengers in 1966 and to goods in 1969. Between these dates there were several changes of name for a station which at its height provided a suburb of Poole with four substantial platforms and a goods yard. A prominent feature of the station was the large footbridge needed to span the four running lines.

Opened as New Poole Junction in 1872, as part of the Southampton and Dorchester Railway, the station was the junction for the new line into Poole that superseded the old station at Lower Hamworthy. When the line was extended to Bournemouth West Broadstone became the junction for the trains to the Bournemouth station. Then the Somerset and Dorset Joint Railway constructed a cutoff line to avoid the need to reverse in Wimborne and Broadstone became the meeting point of two lines, although the construction of further cutoffs to improve access to Bournemouth reduced its importance.

Decline and closure
The first line through Broadstone to close was the Old Road from Ringwood, closed in 1964. The line to Hamworthy Junction was lifted in 1966. This same year, the Somerset and Dorset Joint Railway lost its passenger services. This left Broadstone the junction of two goods lines, one to serve a goods depot at Blandford via a stub of the SDJR and one which passed through Wimborne to serve the RAOC fuel depot at West Moors. The Blandford Forum freight line closed and was lifted in 1969 . The goods traffic to Wimborne maintained a track running through the site until 1977 after which the track was lifted and the land sold for redevelopment.

The site today
Today the site is occupied by Broadstone Leisure Centre, its car park and a traffic roundabout. A subway to Broadstone's shopping area passes under the roads where the railway bridge used to be. This, and the building of some houses on the old trackbed north of the station site, mean that the Castleman Trailway skirts the edge of the former site before regaining the old trackbed on the way to Wimborne.

Further reading

  
   ISBN(no ISBN)

External links
 Broadstone station on navigable 1946 O. S. map
 Station picture on Broadstone.net
 Broadstone station on Subterranea Britannica

Disused railway stations in Dorset
Former London and South Western Railway stations
Railway stations in Great Britain opened in 1872
Railway stations in Great Britain closed in 1966
Beeching closures in England